Additive state decomposition occurs when a system is decomposed into two or more subsystems with the same dimension as that of the original system. A commonly used decomposition in the control field is to decompose a system into two or more lower-order subsystems, called lower-order subsystem decomposition here. In contrast, additive state decomposition is to decompose a system into two or more subsystems with the same dimension as that of the original system.

The lower-order subsystem decomposition satisfies

 

By contrast, the additive state decomposition satisfies

On a dynamical control system 
Consider an 'original' system as follows:

where .

First, a 'primary' system is brought in, having the same dimension as the original system:

where 

From the original system and the primary system, the following 'secondary' system is derived:
 
New variables  are defined as follows:

Then the secondary system can be further written as follows:

From the definition, it follows
  

The process is shown in this picture:

Examples

Example 1 
In fact, the idea of the additive state decomposition has been implicitly mentioned in existing literature. An existing example is the tracking controller design, which often requires a reference system to derive error dynamics. The reference system (primary system) is assumed to be given as follows:

  
Based on the reference system, the error dynamics (secondary system) are derived as follows:
  
where 

This is a commonly used step to transform a tracking problem to a stabilization problem when adaptive control is used.

Example 2 
Consider a class of systems as follows:

Choose as the original system and design the primary system as follows:

Then the secondary system is determined by the rule:

By additive state decomposition
 

Since
 
Fortunately, note that is a linear time-invariant system and is independent of the secondary system, for the analysis of which many tools such as the transfer function are available. By contrast, the transfer function tool cannot be directly applied to the original system as it is time-varying.

Example 3 
Consider a class of nonlinear systems as follows:

where  represent the state, output and input, respectively; the function  is nonlinear. Choose as the original system and design the primary system as follows:

Then the secondary system is determined by the rule:

where . Then  and
. Here, the task  is assigned to the linear time-invariant system (a linear time-invariant system being simpler than a nonlinear one). On the other hand, the task  is assigned to the nonlinear system (a stabilizing control problem is simpler than a tracking problem). If the two tasks are accomplished, then . The basic idea is to decompose an original system into two subsystems in charge of simpler subtasks. Then one designs controllers for two subtasks, and finally combines them to achieve the original control task. The process is shown in this picture:

Comparison with superposition principle 
A well-known example implicitly using additive state decomposition is the superposition principle, widely used in physics and engineering.The superposition principle states: For all linear systems, the net response at a given place and time caused by two or more stimuli is the sum of the responses which would have been caused by each stimulus individually. For a simple linear system:
  , 
the statement of the superposition principle means , where
 
 

Obviously, this result can also be derived from the additive state decomposition. Moreover, the superposition principle and additive state decomposition have the following relationship.
From Table 1, additive state decomposition can be applied not only to linear systems but also nonlinear systems.

Applications 
Additive state decomposition is used in stabilizing control, and can be extended to additive output decomposition.

References

Further reading 
 Quan, Quan and Kai-Yuan Cai (2009). "Additive Decomposition and Its applications to Internal-Model-Based Tracking,". Joint 48th IEEE Conference on Decision and Control and 28th Chinese Control Conference, Shanghai, China. 817–822.
 Quan Quan, Hai Lin, Kai-Yuan Cai (2014). "Output Feedback Tracking Control by Additive State Decomposition for a Class of Uncertain Systems," International Journal of Systems Science 45(9): 1799–1813.
 Quan Quan, Kai-Yuan Cai, Hai Lin (2015). "Additive-State-Decomposition-Based Tracking Control Framework for a Class of Nonminimum Phase Systems with Measurable Nonlinearities and Unknown Disturbances," International Journal of Robust and Nonlinear Control 25(2):163–178
 Quan Quan, Lu Jiang, Kai-Yuan Cai. "Discrete-Time Output-Feedback Robust Repetitive Control for a Class of Nonlinear Systems by Additive State Decomposition"

Control theory